Jose Carlos Flores (born June 28, 1973) is a baseball player who briefly appeared in 7 games for the Oakland Athletics in 2002 and 9 games for the Los Angeles Dodgers in 2004.

External links

1973 births
Living people
Los Angeles Dodgers players
Oakland Athletics players
Major League Baseball infielders
Batavia Clippers players
Clearwater Phillies players
Piedmont Phillies players
Scranton/Wilkes-Barre Red Barons players
Tacoma Rainiers players
New Haven Ravens players
Colorado Springs Sky Sox players
Sacramento River Cats players
Las Vegas 51s players
Fresno Grizzlies players
Buffalo Bisons (minor league) players
Baseball players from New York (state)
Texas Longhorns baseball players
Minor league baseball managers